Klyuchiki is a rural locality (a village) in Kultayevskoye Rural Settlement, Permsky District, Perm Krai, Russia. The population was 85 as of 2010. There are 11 streets.

Geography 
Klyuchiki is located 50 km south of Perm (the district's administrative centre) by road. Kukushtan is the nearest rural locality.

References 

Rural localities in Permsky District